Skaaluren Skibsbyggeri A/S was a shipyard in Rosendal, Norway. One of Norway's prominent shipbuilders, it was founded in 1855. 
The yard was founded by Tørris Knudsen Nes (later Tørris Skaaluren) who built the first sloop. Through four generations it built boats of wood, and in 1955 it began building ships with steel hulls, in compliance with and under the supervision of the Norwegian Ministry of Marine.

Skaalurensamlinga is currently a museum where one can see how the old ships were made and the tools used.

References

Shipbuilding companies of Norway
Companies based in Hordaland
Kvinnherad
Companies established in 1855
1855 establishments in Norway